Christopher David Hancock  (born 18 February 1954) is an Anglican priest and Academic, specialised on Christianity and Confucianism.

Biography 
Educated at Highgate School and The Queen's College, Oxford, he was ordained in 1982. He was Curate at Holy Trinity with St John, Leicester and then Chaplain at Magdalene College, Cambridge. He was  Associate professor at  Virginia Theological Seminary and then Vicar of Holy Trinity, Cambridge from 1994 to 2002 when he became  Dean of Bradford, a post he held for two years. After this he was Director for the  Centre for the Study of Christianity in China at King's College London and then Director of the Institute for Religion and Society in Asia. He was chaplain of St Peter's College Oxford. He is currently Director of Oxford House Research and a Visiting Professor at St. Mary's University, London.

Writings 

 Hancock, Christopher (2020). Christianity and Confucianism: Culture, Faith and Politics. London: T&T Clark. 
 Hancock, Christopher (2011). Christianity and Confucianism: Traditions in Dialogue. London: Continuum.

Notes

 

1954 births
Academics of King's College London
People educated at Highgate School
Alumni of The Queen's College, Oxford
Provosts and Deans of Bradford
Living people
Virginia Theological Seminary faculty